Roughlee Booth is a civil parish located in Pendle, Lancashire. It is approximately 449.43 hectares in size and situated in the Forest of Bowland AONB. It borders on the parishes of Blacko, Barrowford, Old Laund Booth, Goldshaw Booth and Barley-with-Wheatley Booth.

Roughlee Booth was once a part of the ancient parish of Whalley, which became a civil parish of the Burnley Rural District itself in 1894 after having been formed in 1866. By 1974 Roughlee Booth had been split from Whalley parish, following the transferral of Newchurch in Pendle to Goldshaw Booth in 1935.

References

Local government in the Borough of Pendle
Forest of Bowland
Civil parishes in Lancashire